The second season of Haikyu!! anime television series is produced by Production I.G. and directed by Susumu Mitsunaka, with Taku Kishimoto handling series composition and Takahiro Kishida providing character designs. It adapted the "Tokyo Expedition" (chapters 72–96) and the first half of "Spring High Preliminary" (chapters 97–149) story arcs from the original manga series of the same name written by Haruichi Furudate. The season was officially announced to be in production, and aired from October 4, 2015 to March 27, 2016.

The series uses four pieces of theme music: two opening themes and two ending themes. From episodes 1 through 13, the opening theme song is "I'm a Believer" by Spyair, while the ending theme song is "Climber" by Galileo Galilei. From episodes 14 through 25, the opening theme song is "FLY HIGH" by Burnout Syndromes, while the ending theme song is "Hatsunetsu (Fever)" (発熱 - はつねつ) by tacica.



Episode list

References

2015 Japanese television seasons
2016 Japanese television seasons
Haikyu!! episode lists
Haikyu!!